Time is the continued sequence of existence and events, and a fundamental quantity of measuring systems.

Time or times may also refer to:

Temporal measurement
 Time in physics, defined by its measurement
 Time standard, civil time specification
 Horology, study of the measurement of time
 Chronometry, science of the measurement of time
 Metre (music), the grouping of basic temporal units, called beats, into regular measures
 Time signature, notational convention for the metre

Businesses 
 Time (bicycle company), a French bicycle manufacturer
 Time Inc., an American publisher of periodicals
 Time Computer Systems, a British brand of Granville Technology Group
 TIME Hotels Management, a UAE hotel management company

Mathematics and its typography
 Times, the operation used for multiplication in mathematics
 Times symbol ×

Computing
 Time (metadata), a representation term
 time (Unix), a shell command on Unix and Unix-like operating systems
 TIME (command), a shell command on DOS, OS/2 and Microsoft Windows operating systems
 System time, a computer's reckoning of real-world time
 Time Protocol, an Internet protocol

Film and television
 Time (1999 film), a Tamil film
 Time (2006 film), a South Korean film
 Time (2007 film), a Malayalam film
 Time (2020 film), an American film
 Time (American TV series) or Timeless,  a 2016–2018 NBC series
 Time (2021 TV series), a 2021 BBC drama series
 Time (British TV programme), a 2006 documentary programme
 Vremya or Time, a Russian TV news programme
 The Time (TV series), a 2018 South Korean television series
 "Time" (Doctor Who), a mini-episode of Doctor Who
 "Time" (Stargate Universe), an episode of Stargate Universe
 "Time" (The Young Ones), an episode of The Young Ones
 "Time", an episode of Don't Hug Me I'm Scared

Literature
 Time (magazine), an American weekly news magazine
 "Time" (xkcd), a strip of the webcomic
 Manifold: Time (1999), a science fiction novel by Stephen Baxter

Music

Bands
 The Time (band), a pop group
 Time (Yugoslav band), a rock band of the 1970s

Albums
 Time (Peter Andre album) (1997)
 Time (Arashi album) (2007)
 Time (Atlantic Starr album) (1994)
 Time (EP), a 2014 EP by Beast
 Time (Jakob Bro album) (2011)
 The Time (Bros album) (1989)
 Time (Bunny Rugs album) (2012)
 Time (Richard Carpenter album) (1987)
 Time (Dave Clark album) (1986)
 Time (Louis Cole album) (2018)
 Time (Mikky Ekko album) (2015)
 Time (Electric Light Orchestra album) (1981)
 Time (Fleetwood Mac album) (1995)
 Time (Steve Howe album) (2011)
 Time (Leo Ieiri album) (2018)
 Time (Klinik album) (1991)
 T.I.M.E. (The Inner Mind's Eye), a 1993 album by Leaders of the New School
 Time (Hugh Masekela album) (2002)
 Time (Kana-Boon album) (2015) 
 Time (Mercyful Fate album) (1994)
 The Time, an EP by Orange Goblin
 Time (Lionel Richie album) (1998)
 Time (Demis Roussos album) (1988)
 Time (Steeleye Span album) (1996)
 Time (Rod Stewart album) (2013)
 Time (Third Day album) (1999)
 Time (Time album) (1972)
 The Time (The Time album) (1981)
 Time (TVXQ album) (2013)
 Time (The Revelator), a 2001 album by Gillian Welch
 Time (Wild album) (2004)
 Time I, a 2012 album by Wintersun
 The Time (Xu Weizhou album) (2017)
 Time (Bibi Zhou album) (2009)
 Times, a 2021 album by SG Lewis

Songs
 "Time" (The Alan Parsons Project song), 1980
 "Time" (David Bowie song), 1973
 "Time" (Dean Brody song), 2016
 "Time" (Chase & Status song), 2011
 "Time" (Childish Gambino song), 2020
 "Time" (Free Nationals, Mac Miller and Kali Uchis song), 2019
 "Time" (INXS song), 1994
 "Time" (Izabo song), 2012
 "Time" (Marion song), 1996
 "Time" (Freddie Mercury song), 1986
 "Time" (K. Michelle song), 2016
 "Time" (Music for Pleasure song), 1983
 "Time" (NF song), 2019
 "Time" (O.Torvald song), 2017
 "Time" (Pink Floyd song), 1973
 "Time" (Utada Hikaru song), 2020
 "Time" (Uzari & Maimuna song), 2015
 "Time" (Tom Waits song), 1985
 "Time" (Kim Wilde song), 1990
 "Time (Clock of the Heart)", by Culture Club, 1982
 "The Time (Dirty Bit)", by The Black Eyed Peas, 2010
 "Time", by All Hail the Silence from Daggers, 2019
 "Time", by Anastacia from Anastacia, 2004
 "Time", by Angra from Angels Cry, 1993
 "Time", by Anthrax on Persistence of Time, 1990
 "Time", by Band-Maid from Just Bring It, 2017
 "Time", by Benny Benassi from Hypnotica, 2003
 "Time", by Blink-182 from Buddha, 1994
 "Time", by Boyzone from Brother, 2010
 "Time", by Jonatha Brooke from My Mother Has 4 Noses, 2014
 "Time", by Embodyment from Songs for the Living, 2002
 "Time", by Hootie & The Blowfish from Cracked Rear View, 1994
 "Time", by iamnot, 2017
 "Time", by Chantal Kreviazuk from What If It All Means Something, 2002
 "Time", by Lower Than Atlantis from Lower Than Atlantis, 2014
 "Time", by Luna from Lunapark, 1992
 "Time", by Madness from Mad Not Mad, 1985
 "Time", by Michael Merchant, sung by Pozo-Seco Singers and also on Campbell's album Galveston, 1966
 "Time", by Ne-Yo from In My Own Words, 2006
 "Time", by Joe Satriani on Crystal Planet, 1998
 "Time", by Ringo Starr from Y Not, 2010
 "Time", by Supergrass from I Should Coco, 1995
 "Time", by Taproot from Welcome, 2002
 "Time", by Joe Walsh from Got Any Gum?, 1987
 "Time", by Fetty Wap from Fetty Wap, 2015
 "Time", by Dennis Wilson from Pacific Ocean Blue, 1977
 "Time", by Hans Zimmer from Inception: Music from the Motion Picture, 2010
 "Time (Take Your Time)", by Scatman John from Scatman's World, 1995
 "Time", by Syn Cole

Musicals
 Time (musical), by Dave Clark, David Soames, Jeff Daniels and David Pomeranz

Places
 Time, Norway, a municipality in Rogaland county, Norway
 Time, Illinois, a hamlet in Pike County, Illinois, United States

Other uses
 Time (cigarette), an Israeli cigarette brand
 Time Church, a church near Bryne in Rogaland county, Norway
 Titan Mare Explorer (TiME), a proposed spacecraft
 Top Industrial Managers for Europe (TIME), a network of engineering schools and technical universities
 Fountain of Time or Time, a Chicago sculpture
 Father Time, a personification of time

See also

Articles
 Grammatical tense
 Thyme
 TYME

Disambiguation pages
 My Time
 Real-time
 Spacetime
 The Times
 Timescape
 Tine
 Tyne